Varyap Meridian Project is a mixed-use development located in Istanbul's new financial and business district. Varyap Meridian A Block is the tallest building in this project, at 244 m.

Location
It is set in the Ataşehir District of Istanbul at the crossroads of major highways, subway lines and the airport.

See also 
List of tallest buildings in Istanbul
List of tallest buildings in Turkey
List of tallest buildings in the World

References 
Buildings and structures in Istanbul